Wang Yi may refer to:

People named Wang Yi (王沂)
 Wang Yi (Yuan dynasty historian) (王沂), one of the compilers of the History of Song
  (王沂; born 1443), politician

People named Wang Yi (王毅)
 Wang Yi (politician) (王毅; born 1953), Director of the Central Foreign Affairs Commission Office and member of the Politburo of the Chinese Communist Party
 Wang Yi (water polo) (王毅; born 1987), water polo player
 Wang Yi (footballer) (王毅; born 1990), Chinese football (soccer) player
 Denny Wang (王毅; born 1998), Chinese football (soccer) player whose Chinese name is Wang Yi

People named Wang Yi (王怡)
 Wang Yi (pastor) (王怡; born 1973), Chinese Calvinist pastor
 Wang Yi (volleyball) (王怡; born 1973), Olympic volleyball player

Other people
  (王邑), commander in the Battle of Kunyang, 23 CE
 Wang Yi (librarian) (王逸), Han dynasty librarian, minor poet, and anthologist
 Wang Yi (wife of Zhao Ang) (王異), wife of Eastern Han dynasty official Zhao Ang, joined her husband in resisting the warlord Ma Chao
 Wang Yi (painter) (王繹; born 1330), Yuan dynasty painter
 Wang Yi (dissident) (王译; born 1963/64), human rights activist
 Wang Yi (figure skater) (王一; born 1992), figure skater 
 Wang Yi (王弋), older brother of famous Chinese singer Faye Wong

Companies
 NetEase (網易; pinyin: WǎngYì), Chinese Internet technology company